The 2022 Chinese Women's Football League, officially known as the 2022 China Taiping Chinese Football Association Women's Football League for sponsorship reasons, was the 8th season in its current incarnation. It was held from 11 April to 17 September 2022.

Effects of the COVID-19 pandemic
On 9 April, the Chinese Football Association announced dates and the format of the season. The season will be held from 11 April to 9 September 2022 and it was divided into regular season and promotion stage. The regular season was divided into 3 stages (5, 3, 3 rounds respectively). In the first stage, 12 teams were divided into 2 groups of six teams. In the second and the third stage, the teams in 2 groups will be switched to ensure that each team would play against each other once. Six highest-ranked teams after the third stage will qualify for the promotion stage. In the promotion stage, each team will play against each other once.

Shanghai Shenhua withdrew from the first stage due to travel restrictions as a result of the lockdown measures enforced in Shanghai due to the COVID-19 pandemic.

Groups

Centralised venues
Kunming (Groups A, B)
Yunnan Haigeng Football Training Base
Dalian (Groups C, D, E and F)
Dalian Youth Football Training Base
Chengdu (Promotion stage)
Wenjiang Football Training Base

Dates
 First stage (Round 1-5): 11–25 April
 Second stage (Round 6-8): 22–31 May
 Third stage (Round 9-11): 2–9 June
 Promotion stage: 5–17 September

Clubs

Club changes

To Football League
Teams relegated from 2021 Chinese Women's Super League
 Zhejiang

Club promoted from 2021 Chinese Women's League Two
 Guangxi Pingguo Beinong
 Hainan Qiongzhong

From Football League
Club promoted to 2022 Chinese Women's Super League
 Shaanxi Chang'an Athletic

Dissolved entries
 Qingdao Huanghai

Name changes
 Chongqing Lander W.F.C. changed their name to Yongchuan Chashan Zhuhai.

Stadiums and locations

Regular season

League table

Results

Positions by round

Results by match played

Promotion stage

League table

Results

Positions by round

Results by match played

References

External links
Official Website

2022
2021–22 domestic women's association football leagues
2022–23 domestic women's association football leagues
+